Sofía Gala Castiglione (born 24 January 1987), is an Argentine actress.

Daughter of the actress Moria Casán and producer Mario Castiglione, Sofía Gala grew up in the dressing rooms of revues, during the filming of Alberto Olmedo and Jorge Porcel's films, and in the backstage gossip television shows. As a teenager, she generated controversy by posing nude with her mother at age 13, and dating a 38-year-old man when she was 15.

Her acting debut came with Los Roldán, in 2004 at age 17. In 2007, she starred in the movie El resultado del amor, a role that earned her a Silver Condor Award and the distinction of 'best actress' in the Festival de Cine Iberoamericano de Huelva.

Filmography

Television

References

External links
 
 

1987 births
Argentine child actresses
Argentine people of Italian descent
Argentine stage actresses
Argentine film actresses
Argentine telenovela actresses
Argentine television actresses
Living people
Actresses from Buenos Aires